Kevin Earl Federline (born March 21, 1978), often referred to, and also known as K-Fed, is an American dancer, rapper, actor, model, wrestler and DJ. He is known for his two-year marriage to American singer Britney Spears, for whom he was previously a backup dancer, and the child custody battle that followed, which earned significant media coverage. His popularity led to him releasing his critically-panned debut album Playing with Fire in 2006, which is commonly considered to be one of the worst albums ever released. He has since made a number of television appearances, and starred in music videos until 2008.

Early life 
Kevin Earl Federline was born on March 21, 1978, in Fresno, California, to parents Mike and Julie (née Story), a car mechanic and former bank teller from Oregon, respectively. Federline's parents divorced when he was eight years old; then he moved to Carson City, Nevada, with his mother, but returned to Fresno when he was 11, when he and his brother Chris moved to his father's house. In the ninth grade, Federline dropped out of high school (later earning a certificate of General Educational Development) and began dancing with a nonprofit organization called Dance Empowerment.

Career

Early work and musical debut 

For a number of years, he served as a backup dancer for Michael Jackson, Justin Timberlake, Destiny's Child, Pink, and LFO. Federline initially released a download-only song, "Y'all Ain't Ready", and a physical single, "PopoZão" in 2006, shortly after his marriage to Spears. Following poor critical reaction, neither song was included on his debut album. Instead, the first official single was "Lose Control", which he premiered on the Teen Choice Awards show on the Fox network in late summer 2006. He released his debut album, Playing with Fire, on October 31, 2006, with the album being panned by critics.

Federline has been signed to model for the Five Star Vintage line by the San Francisco-based Blue Marlin clothing company. The initial series of ads ran in August 2006 and was subsequently extended for Christmas 2006. The line he modeled for the fall 2006 was the top-selling line in Macy's, Kitson in Los Angeles, and Lord & Taylor.

Federline appeared on WWE programming to promote his album, Playing with Fire, and participate in an angle. He first appeared on the October 16, 2006, and October 23, 2006, editions of WWE Raw, in which he got into physical altercations with WWE Champion John Cena. The following week, he came to the ring to aid Johnny Nitro in his match against John Cena. After Cena got in Federline's face, Federline slapped him hard. He appeared again during the November 5, 2006, pay-per-view event Cyber Sunday, hitting Cena with King Booker's World Heavyweight Championship belt and helping Booker win the Champion of Champions match that was organized between Cena, Booker, and Big Show. The next night, November 6, 2006, he challenged Cena to a match at the New Year's Day edition of Raw, which Cena accepted. He went on to win this no-disqualification match thanks to interference from Johnny Nitro and Umaga. Later in the night, after John Cena's main event match, Cena went after Federline and brought him into the ring and delivered his FU finishing move twice before cameras stopped rolling.

According to the Wrestling Observer Newsletter, Federline was well received backstage. Sources say he worked so well with the company and personnel that the WWE may give him a regular role on the company's show Raw in the near future. Other sources and wrestlers have spoken about Federline's generally good attitude backstage as well.

Television appearances 
Federline was featured in a Nationwide Mutual Insurance Company commercial during Super Bowl XLI on February 4, 2007, as part of its "Life Comes at You Fast" ad series. In the commercial, Federline initially appeared in a music video, rapping about living a high-flying lifestyle. Then reality sets in as Federline is shown now working in a fast-food restaurant with his manager yelling at him, the punchline of the ad being "Life comes at you fast".

Federline guest-starred during several episodes and was subsequently added as a regular on the television series One Tree Hill on The CW. However, he did not appear on the show again after his guest slot.

Federline appeared on the seventh season of the weight-loss reality television show Celebrity Fit Club.

Federline plays a border guard in the 2009 film American Pie Presents: The Book of Love.

In November 2011, on a weight-loss show in Australia called Excess Baggage, Federline was hospitalized for what was called "heat stress". Filming was taking place in November which is the hottest time of the year in the Kimberley region of northern Western Australia.

On January 23, 2012, he suffered chest pains while filming the show.

Personal life

Relationship with Shar Jackson 
Federline was engaged to actress Shar Jackson, with whom he has a daughter, Kori Madison Federline (born July 31, 2002), and a son, Kaleb Michael Jackson Federline (born July 20, 2004). The couple separated shortly before their son's birth. Federline ended things with Jackson for a relationship with pop singer Britney Spears. Jackson later commented that Federline's relationship with Spears "wasn't like just breaking up a relationship. It was like breaking up a family", but sustained an amicable relationship with Federline, complimenting his parenting.

Marriage to Britney Spears 
After three months of dating, Federline and Spears announced their engagement in July 2004; they were married on September 18 in a nondenominational ceremony at a residence in Studio City, California, filing legal papers on October 6. Due to the fact that Federline got into a relationship with Spears when his ex-girlfriend Shar Jackson was pregnant with Federline's second child, the romance between Federline and Spears received intense attention from the media, with accusations of Federline leaving Jackson when she was pregnant to get with Spears and Federline being seen as a "gold digger". The controversy of his breakup with Jackson, the controversy of his relationship with Spears, the accusations of him being a "gold digger", and the disparity in fame between him and Spears all made Federline both a frequent target of ridicule and an extremely disliked celebrity. Federline and Spears have two sons together, born in September 2005 and September 2006. Federline and Spears appeared in the 2005 reality television series Britney & Kevin: Chaotic, which consisted of their home videos. He also appeared in the 2004 movie You Got Served, and subsequently guest-starred in an episode of CSI that premiered in October 2006. He also guest-starred on the NBC show 1 vs. 100, along with the cast of Las Vegas, in the episode "Delinda's Box".

Spears filed for divorce from Federline on November 7, 2006, citing irreconcilable differences and asking for both physical and legal custody of their two sons, with visitation rights for Federline. The following day, Federline filed a response to Spears' divorce petition, seeking physical and legal custody of their children. According to a representative for Federline's lawyer, the divorce filing "caught Kevin totally by surprise". On December 4, 2006, MSNBC reported that Federline set up a home for himself and his family in the Hollywood Hills. The couple reached a global settlement agreement in March 2007 and their divorce was finalized on July 30, 2007. Federline maintains a relationship with Spears' parents for the benefit of their children. Members of Spears' family have been photographed in and out of his home and babysitting the boys while Kevin was out of town.

On October 1, 2007, a court ruling granted Federline sole physical custody of his children, with legal custody to be decided. On the late evening of January 3, 2008, police were called to Spears' home after the singer reportedly refused to relinquish custody of her children to Federline and locked herself in a room with her younger son, Jayden. Spears was taken from her home on a stretcher and hospitalized at Cedars-Sinai Medical Center for appearing to be under the influence of an unknown substance. As a result of this, Federline was "awarded sole legal custody and sole physical custody of the minor children".

On July 26, 2008, court papers were filed stating Federline would retain sole legal and physical custody of the children while Spears would get visitation rights that would increase over time. In addition to this, Federline will receive $20,000 per month from Spears in child support as well as additional funds to cover any custody-related legal expenses.

Marriage to Victoria Prince 
As of 2008 he was linked to former volleyball player Victoria Prince. The two were on the same recreational bowling team, the Party Animals. Their daughter Jordan Kay was born in August 2011; she is Federline's fifth child and Prince's first. They were married on August 10, 2013. In April 2014 they had their second child together, another daughter.

Filmography

Film and television credits

Music videos

Discography 
Albums
 Playing with Fire (2006)

Singles
 "PopoZão" (2006)

Other songs
 "Y'All Ain't Ready" (2005)
 "Lose Control" (2006)
 "Privilege" (2006)
 "Rollin' V.I.P" (2007)
 "Hollywood" (2016)

Music videos
 "PopoZão" (2006)

Guest appearances
"You Should" (from the mixtape Optimus Rime by Ya Boy) (2008)
"Expectations" (from the album Alien by Ya Boy Rich Rocka) (2016)

References

External links 
 

1978 births
Living people
Male actors from Los Angeles
American male film actors
American male dancers
American male professional wrestlers
Male models from California
American male television actors
Participants in American reality television series
Male actors from Fresno, California
Rappers from Los Angeles
Sportspeople from Los Angeles
West Coast hip hop musicians
Professional wrestlers from California
American DJs
People from Fresno, California
2000s controversies in the United States
21st-century American rappers